Bomaribidion is a genus of beetles in the family Cerambycidae, containing the following species:

 Bomaribidion angusticolle (Gounelle, 1909)
 Bomaribidion hirsutum Martins, 1969

References

Ibidionini